Roberto Hernández Ayala (born 11 July 1967) is a Mexican former football player and manager.

Honours

Manager
Neza
Ascenso MX: Clausura 2013

Malacateco
Liga Nacional de Guatemala: Apertura 2021

External links
 

1967 births
Living people
People from La Piedad
Mexican football managers
Liga MX players
Atlético Morelia players
Liga MX managers
Atlético Morelia managers
C.F. Monterrey players
Santos Laguna footballers
Association football defenders
Footballers from Michoacán
Mexican footballers